The Badya is a river in Perm Krai, Russia, a left tributary of Chyornaya which in turn is a tributary of Veslyana.

References 

Rivers of Perm Krai